The Cupari River is a river that flows into the Tapajós in the Amazon rainforest of Brazil. Rio Cupari is in the eastern part of the Amazon River basin.

The river flows through the Itaituba I National Forest, a  sustainable use conservation area established in 1998.
Before entering the Tapajós it flows along the south west boundary of the Tapajós National Forest, a  sustainable use conservation unit created in 1974.

References

Rivers of Pará